The 1983–84 National Hurling League was the 53rd season of the National Hurling League.

Division 1

Kilkenny came into the season as defending champions of the 1982-83 season.

On 8 April 1984, Limerick won the title after a 3-16 to 1-9 win over Wexford in the final. It was their 8th league title overall and their first since 1970-71.

Table

Group stage

Play-offs

Semi-finals

Final

Relegation play-off

Knock-out stage

Quarter-finals

Semi-finals

Final

Scoring statistics

Top scorers overall

Top scorers in a single game

Division 2

Table

Division 3

Table

External links

References

National Hurling League seasons
League
League